Henry VIII: The Mind of a Tyrant is a history documentary series on Henry VIII of England presented by David Starkey. It was first broadcast on Channel 4 from 6 to 27 April 2009.

Episodes
Prince (1485–1509) – Henry's childhood and youth, prior to his accession
Warrior (1509–1525) – Henry's continental military ambitions, the Battle of the Spurs and their final frustration by Charles V, Holy Roman Emperor and the battle of Pavia, followed by the Field of the Cloth of Gold
Lover (1526–1536) – Henry's love affair and marriage with Anne Boleyn, the annulment of his marriage with Catherine of Aragon, and Anne's fall and execution
Tyrant (1533–1547) – Henry's totalitarian religious and secular policies, as influenced by Anne and others, the Dissolution of the Monasteries, the Pilgrimage of Grace, the Device Forts, the foundation of the Royal Navy, the English Reformation, the Great Bible, the Six Articles, his final three wives, and the fate of his tomb effigy (melted down by Oliver Cromwell) and coffin (now containing Horatio Nelson)

Selected cast
Roger Ashton-Griffiths - Cardinal Thomas Wolsey
Ken Bones – Erasmus
Siobhan Hewlett – Catherine of Aragon
Sophie Hunter – Anne Boleyn
Ryan Kiggell – Thomas More
Laurence Spellman, Adam James, Ian Redford – Henry VIII
David Oakes – George Cavendish
Nick Sampson – Thomas Cromwell
Andrew Havill – Eustace Chapuys
Graham Turner – Robert Aske

External links

2009 British television series debuts
2009 British television series endings
2000s British documentary television series
Television set in Tudor England
Cultural depictions of Henry VIII
Cultural depictions of Anne Boleyn
Cultural depictions of Catherine of Aragon